William Macartney may refer to:

William Macartney (1714–1793), MP for Belfast
Sir William Isaac Macartney, 2nd Baronet (1780–1867), of the Macartney baronets
William Ellison-Macartney (1852–1924)
Sir William Isaac Macartney, 4th Baronet (1867–1942), of the Macartney baronets

See also
William McCartney (disambiguation)